The Central Bank of Iraq Tower (Arabic: برج البنك المركزي العراقي) (Romanized: Burj albank almarkazii aleiraqii) also known as Zaha Hadid tower, is a 37 story tower located on the banks of the Tigris river in the Al-Jadiriya district of Baghdad, Iraq. The tower aims to become Iraq's second tallest building after the E1 tower in Erbil. and Baghdad's tallest building with a height of 170m. The tower is entirely usable space and has no antenna. The tower symbolizes a new era for Baghdad and Iraq as a whole.

Overview 
The Central Bank of Iraq (CBI) had commissioned the Iraqi-British architect Zaha Hadid in 2010 to design the project, and was presented in 2011, however construction on the project only began in late 2018 and it's scheduled to be completed in 2023. The tower will serve as the new headquarters for the Central Bank of Iraq, Iraq's national bank. It's also features VIP entrance, visitor entrance, main lobby, museums, personnel entrance, energy center, public area, personnel facility, cash management area, data center, security center and landscaping areas.

Design 
The powerful structural exoskeleton frames the facade which is itself composed of alternating pattern of open and closed elements that visually and conceptually mimic the light reflection from waves in the river below, reinforcing the dynamism of the design and serving the practical purpose of providing a variety of areas of light and shade within. Solid and purposeful at its base, the exoskeleton gradually opens and reduces the tower rises skywards, bringing greater lightness and views across the capital, Baghdad. The bank's podium weaves hard and soft landscaping together and anchors the building within its context; gradually adjusting its scale through a series of landscaped terraces and gardens to directly engage with surrounding neighborhood and manage access to the bank. The vertical layers of the tower's exoskeleton are transformed to the horizontal podium and subtly re-emerge within the landscape.

Gallery

Sources 

Buildings and structures completed in 2022
Skyscrapers in Iraq
Buildings and structures in Baghdad